Al-Hebnaa is a neighborhood of the Al-Kadhimyah District in northern Baghdad, Iraq. It is located on the Karkh side of Baghdad, its boundaries being Muheit Street on the north, Mus'a Al-Kadoom Street on the east, Old Hebnaa Street on the west, and the rest of Al-Kadhimyah city to the South. 

Hebnaa